Momentum (Live in Manila) is a live & studio EP from Planetshakers. Planetshakers Ministries International and Integrity Music released the album on 25 March 2016. The EP was recorded in Manila, at the Araneta Coliseum. This collection of songs were written and recorded over many months in Australia, Philippines and the United States. 
The song "I Know Who You Are" on the Billboard Christian Songs chart ranked #30.

Critical reception

Joshua Andre, in a four star review for 365 Days of Inspiring Media, wrote: "Overall an enjoyable album that has definitely continues my reinvigorated interest for Planetshakers a bit more; this album has certainly created momentum, and given me new songs to sing out to Jesus during times of joy and hardship.

Track listing

Charts
Momentum (Live in Manila) debuted at #4 on the iTunes Christian and Gospel Charts.

Singles

References

2016 live albums
Planetshakers albums